José Duarte is the name of:

 José Duarte (footballer) (born 1980), Brazilian footballer
 José Napoleón Duarte (1925–1990), Salvadoran political figure
 José Duarte (football manager) (1935–2004), Brazilian football manager